SMPTE 259M is a standard published by SMPTE which "describes a 10-bit serial digital interface operating at 143/270/360 Mb/s."

The goal of SMPTE 259M is to define a serial digital interface (based on a coaxial cable), called SDI or SD-SDI.

There are 4 bit rates defined, which are normally used to transfer the following standard video formats:

References

Film and video technology
SMPTE standards